The Ayuntamiento de Granada is the institution charged with the government and administration of the Spanish municipality of Granada.

History 
Early modern period
Following the conquest of Granada in 1492, the offices of corregidor and regidor(es) were established in Granada. While the Constitutive Charter granted by the Catholic Monarchs on 20 September 1500 has been traditionally framed by most authors as the point of origin of the city's municipal regime, the document has been more recently argued to rather be a reform or restructuration of preexisting political realities. The latter royal stipulations established a municipal institutional structure consisting of 1 corregidor, 24 regidores and 2 ordinary alcaldes, remaining a corregimiento from then on for most of the Early Modern period. Throughout this period, the number of regidores ranged from 44 (1587) to 15 (1787), while a military background (capa y espada) prevailed vis-à-vis the extraction of the monarch-appointed corregidor, the highest ranking official. Most often, the two alcaldes were experts in law covering the shortcomings of the corregidor on that field. While originally the regidores were appointed at the discretion of the monarch, eventually the trade of the condition of regidor thrived.

Structure 

It is formed by the Plenary (Pleno), the Mayor (alcalde) and the Local Government Board (Junta de Gobierno Local).

The Plenary of the Ayuntamiento is the body of political representation of the citizens in the municipal government. Its members (as of 2019, 27), known as concejales ("municipal councillors"), are elected for a 4-year mandate following the schedule of the country-wide municipal elections. They are organised in municipal groups.

The mayor (alcalde), the supreme representative of the city, presides over the ayuntamiento. The mayor is invested by the municipal councillors from among themselves following each municipal election.

The Local Government Board consists of the mayor, the deputy mayor(s) and a number of delegates assuming the portfolios for the different government areas, delegated by the mayor. All those positions are held by municipal councillors.

Following the May 2019 municipal election,  (Citizens), was invested as Mayor of Granada on 15 June 2019.

Headquarters 
The city hall is located at a building in the plaza del Carmen, the undemolished part of a convent of female Discalced Carmelites where the municipal premises were moved to from the old Madrasah of Granada in 1858 following the ecclesial desamortización.

References 
Citations

Bibliography
 
 

Granada
Politics of Andalusia
City councils in Spain